GMA Affordabox is a Philippine ISDB-T digital terrestrial television provider distributed and being marketed by GMA New Media, a subsidiary of GMA Network, Inc. The service distributes digital set-top boxes and USB OTG dongles with free-to-air digital TV channels, broadcast markup language, emergency warning broadcast system, functional auto-on alert, digital display, and info display services to select areas in the Philippines.

History
In June 2010, the National Telecommunications Commission announced that it would formally adopt the Japanese standard ISDB-T for digital broadcasting and issued a circular commanding all the country's television networks to switch-off their analog services on December 31, 2015, at 11:59 p.m. Philippine Standard Time (UTC+8). But due to delay of the release of the implementing rules and regulations for digital television broadcast, the target date was moved to 2023.

In February 2013, GMA Network was able to conduct field tests of digital broadcast using the Japanese standard ISDB-T in digital television on UHF Channel 27 (551.143 MHz), despite they remain unconvinced saying European standard DVB-T2 is superior to ISDB-T. However, in October 2013, the NTC issued a draft memorandum circular adopting the Japanese standard as the sole standard in the delivery of digital terrestrial television (DTT) services in the Philippines.

On May 15, 2019, GMA's digital broadcast was moved to its permanent frequency on Channel 15, due to its former frequency, Channel 27 will used by GMA News TV beginning on June 4, as the blocktime deal between GMA and ZOE terminated, resulting to its said channel's former frequency Channel 11 became silent the following day.

In June 2020, images of GMA's owned DTV set-top box were surrounded online and a teaser was revealed on June 17. GMA Network officially launched GMA Affordabox on June 26, 2020 during Tutok to Win sa Wowowin.

Offered services

GMA Affordabox 
GMA Network's flagship product digital set-top boxes intended for home use.

GMA Now 
On December 12, 2020, GMA Network released its mobile dongle designed for USB OTG-capable Android smartphone, dubbed as GMA Now on Lazada and Shopee online. It allows users to watch free-to-air channels on their Android smartphones and has extra features such as a video-on-demand feature to stream GMA's online content, a Groupee Chat (web chat), and interactive promos to join. It also supports Picture-in-picture mode and screen recording. GMA Network officially launched GMA Now on February 7, 2021 during All-Out Sundays, and it also announced it will support for iPhone users soon.

Channel lineup

UHF Channel 15 (479.143 MHz)1

1 For Mega Manila only, channel and frequency varies on regional stations.

Channel and frequency

See also
 Digital terrestrial television in the Philippines

Notes

References

GMA Network (company)
Digital television in the Philippines
Products introduced in 2020
2020 establishments in the Philippines